Fruit syrups or fruit molasses are concentrated fruit juices used as sweeteners.

Fruit syrups have been used in many cuisines:
 in Arab cuisine, rub, jallab;
 in Ancient Greek cuisine, epsima;
 in Greek cuisine, petimezi;
 in Indian cuisine, drakshasava;
 in Ottoman cuisine, pekmez;
 in Persian cuisine, robb-e anâr;
 in Ancient Roman cuisine, defrutum, carenum, and sapa.

Some foods are made using fruit syrups or molasses:
 Churchkhela, a sausage-shaped candy made from grape must and nuts

In modern industrial foods, they are often made from a less expensive fruit (such as apples, pears, or pineapples) and used to sweeten more expensive fruits or products and to extend their quantity. A typical use would be for an "all-fruit" strawberry spread that contains apple juice as well as strawberries.

See also
Cheong
 Grape syrup
 List of syrups
 Squash (drink)

References

External links

Fruit juice
Syrup